Marin Draganja and Adrián Menéndez-Maceiras are the defending champions, but Marin Draganja chose not to compete. Adrián Menéndez-Maceiras played alongside Agustín Velotti.

Kevin King and Juan Carlos Spir won the title, defeating Adrián Menéndez-Maceiras and Agustín Velotti  in the final, 6–3, 6–4.

Seeds

  Marcelo Arévalo /  Nicolás Barrientos (quarterfinals)
  Kevin King /  Juan Carlos Spir (champions)
  César Ramírez /  Miguel Ángel Reyes-Varela (quarterfinals)
  Adrián Menéndez-Maceiras /  Agustín Velotti (final)

Draw

Main draw

References
 Main Draw

San Luis Potosí Challenger - Doubles
2014 Doubles